Craterellus calicornucopioides is an edible fungus in the family Cantharellaceae. Described by David Arora and Jonathan L. Frank in 2015, is the North American version of the similar European species Craterellus cornucopioides. Molecular phylogenetics has shown that they are, however, distinct species.

References

External links
 

Edible fungi
Cantharellales
Fungi of North America
Fungi described in 2015